Redmond may refer to:

Redmond (name)
 Redmond Linux, a computer operating system from the former Lycoris (company)

Places

United States
 Redmond, Oregon
 Redmond, Utah
 Redmond, Washington
 John Redmond Reservoir, Kansas, USA

Elsewhere
 Ballyredmond (Redmond's Town), a townland in County Carlow, Ireland
 Redmond, Western Australia, a townsite and train station in the Great Southern region

Companies
 "Redmond" is sometimes used as a metonym for Microsoft Corporation, due to its headquarters being in Redmond, Washington.

See also
 Redmon (disambiguation)